Levi Barkley House, also known as the Barkley, Baxter, Landis House, is a historic home located near Hannibal, Marion County, Missouri.  It was built about 1860, and is a two-story, vernacular Greek Revival style brick dwelling with a two-story rear ell. It has a double-pile, central hall, plan and sits on a stone foundation. It originally had a two-story front portico and rear gallery, later reduced to one story.

It was added to the National Register of Historic Places in 1984.

References

Houses on the National Register of Historic Places in Missouri
Greek Revival houses in Missouri
Houses completed in 1860
Houses in Hannibal, Missouri
National Register of Historic Places in Marion County, Missouri